Emory Dilworth Bellard (December 17, 1927 – February 10, 2011) was a college football coach. He was head coach at Texas A&M University from 1972 to 1978 and at Mississippi State University from 1979 until 1985. Bellard died on February 10, 2011, after battling amyotrophic lateral sclerosis (Lou Gehrig's disease) since the fall of 2010.

Bellard is a member of the Texas Sports Hall of Fame. He was considered to have had one of the most innovative offensive minds in football and is credited for inventing the wishbone formation.

Early life
A native of Luling, Texas, Bellard was one of 12 children. His father was a geologist and driller who arrived in Central Texas in the late 1920s to take part in the emerging oil boom. Bellard graduated from Aransas Pass High School and went on to attend the University of Texas at Austin, where he played his freshman year under coach Dana X. Bible. Bellard broke his leg during his sophomore season and later transferred to Southwest Texas State University (now Texas State University).

Coaching career

High school
Bellard was a high school head coach for 21 seasons, where he achieved a record of 177–59–9 and won three state titles. During his time as a high school coach, he explored the idea of running an offense out of a three-back formation.

Bellard began coaching at Ingleside High School, a Class B school in Ingleside, Texas. He guided the school to two consecutive regional wins (as far as Class B football went) in 1953 and 1954, and a street near Ingleside High School is named after him. He was then hired to succeed Joe Kerbel at Breckenridge High School, then a state powerhouse in the second-highest UIL classification. Under coach Kerbel and his predecessor Cooper Robbins, Breckenridge won three 3A state championships in 1951, 1952, and 1954. Bellard continued that winning tradition with state titles in 1958 and 1959.

In 1960, Bellard was selected over Gordon Wood to replace Bob Harrell as head coach at Central High School in San Angelo, Texas. San Angelo Central was playing in the highly competitive District 2-4A, nicknamed the "Little Southwest Conference", against perennial state champions such as Abilene and Odessa Permian. Bellard amassed a 59–19–2 record at San Angelo Central, winning a 4A state championship in 1966. He then left the high school ranks for the University of Texas at Austin.

In 1988, Bellard returned to the high school level, coaching Spring Westfield High School near Houston, Texas, to a 41–22–5 record over six seasons.

College

Texas
In 1967, Bellard was hired as the linebackers coach at the University of Texas at Austin and was moved to offensive coordinator in 1968. At this time, he developed and implemented the wishbone formation, a system inspired by the variations of the veer developed by Homer Rice and run by Bill Yeoman at the University of Houston.

Texas A&M
Bellard became head coach at Texas A&M in 1972, taking over head-coaching duties from Gene Stallings. In his seven years at Texas A&M, he finished with a record of 48–27 and three top-15 finishes.

Acting as his own offensive coordinator, Bellard hired former high school football coaches to assist him as backfield coaches, including Gil Bartosh (1973) and Chuck Moser (1974–1978). Both Bartosh and Moser had won Texas state championships. In 1975, however, Bellard hired Tom Wilson away from Jim Carlen's Texas Tech coaching staff to serve as the Aggies' offensive coordinator.  For the defensive department, Bellard hired Melvin Robertson, one of the top defensive coaches, away from Bill Yeoman's coaching staff at the University of Houston. Robertson became defensive coordinator, and among his assistants were R. C. Slocum and Dan LaGrasta.

Bellard's first two seasons at Texas A&M were difficult, as his Aggies finished 3–8 and 5–6, respectively. In 1974, with a pair of his own recruiting classes suited to run the wishbone formation, the Aggies went 8–3, then followed it up with two 10–2 seasons, including a pair of wins over Royal and the Longhorns and three consecutive bowl games.  After starting the 1978 season 4–0, Bellard resigned mid-season after two consecutive losses: 33–0 to Houston and 24–6 to Baylor.

Mississippi State
After A&M, Bellard spent seven seasons as head coach at Mississippi State University. His best years as the Bulldogs head coach were in 1980 and 1981, when his team finished 9–3 and 8–4, respectively. Also, Bellard was the coach when Mississippi State defeated number 1, undefeated Alabama 6-3 in Jackson, Mississippi in 1980.

However, the Bulldogs significantly regressed after 1981. In the next four seasons, he only won a total of four games in SEC play. Before the 1985 season, Bellard boldly predicted that the Bulldogs would rebound and win their first SEC title since 1941. They not only failed to do so, but went winless in SEC play. Bellard was fired after the season.

Head coaching record

College

*Bellard resigned after 6 games

References

External links
 

1927 births
2011 deaths
Mississippi State Bulldogs football coaches
Texas A&M Aggies athletic directors
Texas A&M Aggies football coaches
Texas Longhorns football coaches
Texas Longhorns football players
Texas State Bobcats football players
High school football coaches in Texas
People from Aransas County, Texas
People from Luling, Texas
People from San Patricio County, Texas
Deaths from motor neuron disease
Neurological disease deaths in Texas